The British Crystallographic Association (BCA) is an association for crystallographers, based in the United Kingdom. It is one of the largest crystallographic societies in the world.

The Association administers a Dorothy Hodgkin Prize and an Arnold Beevers Bursary Fund.

See also
 American Crystallographic Association
 German Crystallographic Society

References

External links
 BCA website

Organizations with year of establishment missing
Crystallography organizations
Professional associations based in the United Kingdom
Scientific organisations based in the United Kingdom